JazzCash, formerly known as MobiCash, is a Pakistani mobile wallet, mobile payments, and branchless banking services provider. It was launched in 2012 as MobiCash by Mobilink (now Jazz) in partnership with their subsidiary bank Mobilink Microfinance Bank. It has a market share of 64 percent in mobile money activity.

It also provides digital payment service through QR code in partnership with Masterpass.

History
JazzCash was launched in 2012 as MobiCash by Mobilink (now Jazz) in partnership with Waseela Bank, which was later renamed as Mobilink Microfinance Bank. In 2016, MobiCash was renamed as JazzCash.

In 2020, JazzCash partnered with Payoneer to provide freelancers with a solution that would allow them to withdraw funds from their Payoneer account through their JazzCash wallet. Currently, more than one lac such accounts has been linked to JazzCash.

See also
 Easypaisa
 Raast

References 

Jazz (mobile network operator)
Mobile payments
Pakistani brands
Pakistani companies established in 2012